Life Love Flesh Blood is the fifth studio album by Irish singer-songwriter Imelda May. It was first released in the Republic of Ireland on 7 April 2017, through label Decca Records, followed by a worldwide release two weeks later on 21 April 2017. The album, a follow-up to May's previous album Tribal (2014), was created in collaboration with American musician T Bone Burnett. Serving as the primary producer for the record, Burnett was only credited alongside Scottish producer Cam Blackwood. Blackwood produced a duet version of the album's lead single "Call Me", recorded with English vocalist Jack Savoretti, included on streaming editions of the album post-release. Throughout the album's creative process, May received guidance from Irish musician Bono, of rock group U2. The album followed May's divorce from guitarist Darrel Higham, influencing many lyrical themes on the album. Life Love Flesh Blood features soft rock and acoustic styles, differing significantly from the rockabilly genre of previous albums.

Commercially, the album peaked at number two on the Irish Albums Chart (IRMA), prevented from reaching number one by Ed Sheeran's album ÷. The album reached number one on the UK americana chart, where it remained for three weeks, consequently preventing American musician Chris Stapleton from topping the chart with his album From A Room: Volume 1. Three singles were released from the album: "Call Me", "Black Tears", and "Should've Been You". The album also features guest appearances by pianist Jools Holland and guitarist Jeff Beck. In support of the album, May embarked on an international concert tour, beginning May 2017.

Background and development

To critical acclaim, May released her previous album, Tribal, on 25 April 2014. In July 2015, May announced that she had split from her husband, guitarist Darrel Higham. He served as her creative partner and collaborator for most of her previous albums. Following their divorce, Higham also quit May's band. The break-up influenced many of the themes on the album, but also gave May the courage to depart from her previous rockabilly genre. In a July 2015 interview with the Irish Independent, May confirmed that she had started working on the album, and that the release was slated for early 2016. After being postponed, the album was finally announced in November 2016, scheduled to be released on 31 March 2017. However, the album was delayed by a week in May's home-country the Republic of Ireland, and rescheduled to 21 April 2017 elsewhere.

The album was recorded over the course of seven days, in the city of Los Angeles. Some of the album's songs, such as "Black Tears", were written in the U.S. city of Nashville. Burnett introduced May to a small studio band, which consisted himself and Marc Ribot on guitars, Dennis Crouch on bass, Jay Bellerose on drums, and Patrick Warren on keyboards.

Title, package, and artwork
May explains why she named the album Life Love Flesh Blood in an interview with Irish magazine VIP: "There are some heartbreak songs on there but then I fell in love again, and had my heart broken again, I was up and down so I write about love and lust and guilt and joy and my family and my child and getting older or getting younger mentally. I wrote about everything, which is why I called the album Life Love Flesh Blood". Photography and creative design for the album were handled by Roger Deckker and Eddie Otchere-Dhagren. Five different packages of the album exist: standard edition, deluxe CD, deluxe download, HMV.com exclusive edition, and a heavyweight vinyl pressing. The deluxe CD is accompanied by a 36-page hardcover book, and signed copies were available on May's website. The HMV.com exclusive edition features two ukulele cover tracks: "It Must Be Love" by Labi Siffre, and "All I Want Is You" by U2.

Promotion
"Call Me" was released as the album's lead single on 18 November 2016. May appeared on the 2016-17 edition of the New Year's Eve program Jools' Annual Hootenanny, where she performed the song "Black Tears". On 5 April 2017, May performed the third single from the album, "Should've Been You" on The One Show. On 7 April 2017, May was interviewed by Ryan Tubridy on the Irish chat show The Late Late Show.

Critical reception

Life Love Flesh Blood received generally positive reviews from critics. At Metacritic, which assigns a normalized rating out of 100 to reviews from mainstream critics, the album received an average score of 73, which indicates "generally favourable reviews". Seven professional reviews were used to calculate the rating. Ben Beaumont-Thomas from The Guardian rated the album 3 out of 5 stars, and commented that "the songwriting is rock solid, and in an age of will-this-do toplines, her melodic touch should not be undervalued; take 6ixth Sense, which has a satisfying direction to its doo-wop tinged meandering". Tony Clayton-Lea from The Irish Times praised May's career reinvention, saying that her "former music stylings have mostly been replaced with elegant, reflective readings from the soul/blues/jazz/pop songbook, and they fit her like a long satin glove".

In a positive review, Rick Pearson from the Evening Standard praised the "bluesy" ballads on the album - "Call Me" and "Black Tears". He commented that they "throb with emotion", and that her vocals were reminiscent of Eva Cassidy at points. Lee Zimmerman of Paste lauded the eclectic genres on the album, saying that "it’s little wonder then that May’s come-hither desire becomes the central theme, with the music providing the appropriate cushion to buttress her intents. It’s mostly twilight jazz, but varied enough to wander to an occasional tango ("I Choose Love"), Van Morrison-like balladry ("Call Me") or far more edgier intents ("Leave Me Lonely", "Game Changer")".

Commercial performance
Life Love Flesh Blood debuted at number two on the Irish Albums Chart on 14 April 2017, as published by the IRMA. In the United Kingdom, the album debuted at five on the UK Albums Chart, as published by the Official Charts Company. The album was May's third album to enter the top ten of the chart. The album reached number one on the UK Americana Albums chart and was the best-selling Americana album by a UK artist in 2017. In Scotland, the album debuted at four. The album was prevented from reaching number one, as it fell behind Ed Sheeran's third album, ÷. In Belgium, the album charted at 60 and 69 on the Flanders and Wallonia Ultratop charts, respectively.

Track listing
All tracks produced by T Bone Burnett, except where noted.

Personnel
Credits adapted from Life Love Flesh Blood liner notes.

Music 
 
 Jeff Beck – guitar 
 Jay Bellerose – drums 
 Cam Blackwood – music production 
 Bono – mentoring and guidance
 T Bone Burnett – music production , guitar 
 Billy Centenaro – second engineering 
 Eli Crews – additional engineering 
 Dennis Crouch – acoustic bass 
 Zachary Dawes – electric bass 
 Jools Holland – piano 
 Kylie Kempster – production assistance
 Curtis Laur – equipment technician
 Darrell Leonard – horns arrangement , horn 
 Zach Lizzio – second engineering 
 Gavin Lurssen – mastering 
 Imelda May – vocals , background vocals , background vocal arrangement 
 Vanessa Parr – second engineering 
 Marc Ribot – guitar , ukulele 
 Jack Savoretti – vocals 
 Patrick Warren – keyboards , keyboard arrangement , recording arrangement 
 Chris Wilkinson – additional engineering 
 Carl Wheeler – Hammond organ 
 Jason Wormer – mixing , recording

Band 

 Ryan Aston
 Sean Barry
 Oliver Darling
 Gavin Fitzjohn
 Al Gare
 Petur Hallgrimsson
 Donny Little
 Emma Osei-Lah
 Chris Pemberton
 Dave Priseman
 Steve Ruston
 Ulrika Uma

Touring band 

 Fran Bemrose
 Nidge Dobson
 Trevor Gilligan
 James O'Neill
 Nigel Reavill
 Brett Spence
 Gerry Wilkes

Business 

 T Bone Burnett – executive production
 Nigel Hassler – A&R
 Ken Levitan – management
 Imelda May – executive production
 Peter Rudge – management
 Ivy Skoff – production coordination
 Marsha Vlasic – A&R

Packaging 

 Roger Deckker – photography, design 
 Max Dodson – photography
 Lisa Mejuto – make-up
 Dee Moran – styling
 Eddie Otchere-Dhagren – design 
 Craig Purves – hair
 Steve Stacey – design and art direction

Charts

Certifications

Release history

References

External links
 Life Love Flesh Blood at AnyDecentMusic? (list of collated international reviews)
 
 

2017 albums
Imelda May albums
Decca Records albums
Albums produced by T Bone Burnett
Albums produced by Cam Blackwood
Soft rock albums by Irish artists
Indie pop albums by Irish artists